Enzo Calderari (born 18 April 1952, Bienne, Switzerland) is a Swiss entrepreneur and former car racing driver.

Career 
Enzo Calderari is the son of Jacques Calderari, who was active as a sports car driver in the 1960s. The son, a real estate agent in his day job, can look back on a racing career spanning almost 30 years. He began GT and touring car racing in the 1970s and, together with Marco Vanoli, finished sixth overall in the 1980 European Touring Car Championship (overall winner Helmut Kelleners and Siegfried Müller junior). In addition to further appearances in the European Touring Car Championship, he competed in the German Racing Championship and the World Sportscar Championship.

In 1992, he secured the overall championship of the 1992 Porsche Carrera Trophy ahead of Stefan Oberndorfer and was runner-up in the Porsche Supercup in 1993 behind Altfrid Heger. He celebrated further successes in the FIA GT Championship, where he finished fifth overall in the 2004 championship in a Ferrari 550 Maranello entered by BMS Scuderia Italia. That year he also celebrated overall victory in the Spa-Francorchamps 24 Hours.

The competed five times in the 24 Hours of Le Mans. He made his debut in 1985 and his best finish in the final classification was in 1994 with his then regular co-driver Lilian Bryner and the Italian Renato Mastropietro, when he finished ninth overall. He had his last active season in 2009 in the Italian Touring Car Championship, then retired from active racing.

References

External links 
 Enzo Calderari career summary at DriverDB.com

Swiss businesspeople
Swiss racing drivers
12 Hours of Sebring drivers
24 Hours of Spa drivers
24 Hours of Le Mans drivers
FIA GT Championship drivers
Living people
1952 births
24H Series drivers